Ahmed Moussa, alt. Ahmad Moussa, Ahmed Mussa, or Ahmed Musa etc., may refer to:

 Ahmed Moussa (Egyptian) (born 1975), Supply Chain Manager
 Ahmed Moussa (judoka) (born 1951), Algerian Olympic judoka
 Ahmed Musa (born 1992), Nigerian footballer
 Ahmed Musa (politician), Nigerian politician for the People's Democratic Party
 Ahmed Mohamed Musa (born 1984), Qatari footballer
 Ahmed Mousa Mirza (born 1976), Kuwaiti footballer
 Ahmed Moussa (Egyptologist) (1934–1998), Egyptian Egyptologist
 Ahmed Al-Mousa, Saudi Arabian footballer 
 Ahmed Gamal El-Din Moussa (born 1951), Egyptian Minister of Education
 Ahmed Hassan Musa (died 1979), Chadian insurgent
 Ahmed Mussa (presenter) (born 1961), Egyptian journalist and TV presenter
 Ahmad Hassan Moussa (born 1981), Qatari Olympic decathlete
 Ahmed-Idriss Moussa (born 1933), Djiboutian politician who served in the French National Assembly, 1962–1967